Archibald Graham may refer to:

Sports
 Archibald Wright "Moonlight" Graham or Moonlight Graham (died 1965), US baseball player
Archibald Graham (cricketer) (1917-2000), New Zealand cricketer
Archibald Graham (golfer) in United States Amateur Championship (golf)
Archie Graham (rugby union), Namibian player in 2003 Rugby World Cup squads

Others
 Archibald Graham (bishop) (died 1702), Scottish prelate
Archie Graham (city councillor), husband of Johann Lamont